Touch of Soul is the only studio album by American contemporary R&B group Art n' Soul, released  via Big Beat Records. The album was co-produced by Craig Kallman and Tony! Toni! Toné! drummer Timothy Christian Riley. It did not chart on the Billboard 200; however, it peaked at #36 on the R&B Albums chart and #27 on the Heatseekers chart.

Two singles were released from the album: "Ever Since You Went Away" and "All My Luv". "Ever Since You Went Away" was the group's only song to chart on the Billboard Hot 100, peaking at #72 in 1996.

Track listing

Samples

A. 
B.
C.
D.

Chart positions

References

External links
 

1996 debut albums
Albums produced by Craig Kallman
Big Beat Records (American record label) albums
Contemporary R&B albums by American artists